The 2018–19 Macedonian Football Cup was the 27th season of North Macedonia's football knockout competition. Shkëndija were the defending champions, having won their second title in the previous year.

Competition calendar

First round
The matches were played on 22 August 2018.

|colspan="3" style="background-color:#97DEFF" align=center|22 August 2018

|-
|colspan="3" style="background-color:#97DEFF" align=center|29 August 2018

|-
|colspan="3" style="background-color:#97DEFF" align=center|5 September 2018

|}

Second round 
The first legs were played on 19 September and the second legs will be played on 3 October 2018.

||colspan="2" rowspan="1" 
|}

Quarter-finals 
The first legs were played on 7 November and the second legs will be played on 5 December 2018. 

|}

Semi-finals 
The first legs were played on 27 February and the second legs on 10 April 2019.

Summary

|}

Matches

Makedonija GP won 2–0 on aggregate.

Akademija Pandev won 6–2 on aggregate.

Final

Season statistics

Top scorers

See also
2018–19 Macedonian First Football League
2018–19 Macedonian Second Football League
2018–19 Macedonian Third Football League

References

External links
 Official Website

North Macedonia
Cup
Macedonian Football Cup seasons